U.S. Bank Tower (also called 621 Capitol Mall) is a 25-story,  building in Sacramento, California. The office tower is located at 621 Capitol Mall and was completed in early 2008.

The building's architect is Hellmuth, Obata + Kassabaum, Inc. (HOK) and the general contractor is Hensel Phelps Construction.

The building has a series of LED screens on the top that seem to form a flowing river or waterway at night, with colors changing from light/dark blues to purples. They are easily seen since this building is the second tallest in Sacramento. This artwork was created by Michael Hayden of Santa Rosa, California, and is a companion to an LED installation in the lobby of the building by the same artist.

Gallery

See also
List of tallest buildings in Sacramento

References

External links 

 
 LoopNet.com Property Summary: US Bank Tower, Sacramento

Buildings and structures in Sacramento, California
Office buildings completed in 2008
Skyscraper office buildings in Sacramento, California
U.S. Bank buildings
HOK (firm) buildings